Reichert is a surname. Notable people with the surname include:

 Alexander Julius Reichert (1859–1939), German entomologist
 Benjamin Reichert (born 1983), German former professional football player and co-founder of the SK Gaming e-sports clan
 Craig Reichert (born 1974), Canadian former professional ice hockey player
 Dan Reichert (born 1976), American professional baseball pitcher and later pitching coach
 Dave Reichert (born 1950), American politician, U.S. Representative from Washington State
 Don Reichert (1932–2013), Canadian painter, photographer and digital media artist
 Heinrich Reichert (1949–2019), Swiss neurobiologist
 Karl Bogislaus Reichert (1811–1883), German anatomist
 Kittens Reichert (1910–1990), American child actress in silent films
 Manfred Reichert (1940-2010), German football defender
 Marcus Reichert (born 1948), American painter, poet, author, photographer, and film writer/director
 Maureen Reichert (born 1934), Zimbabwean sport shooter
 Mickey Zucker Reichert (born 1962), American fantasy fiction author
 Nathan Reichert, American politician; Iowa State Representative 2005–2011
 Ossi Reichert (1925–2006), German Alpine skier
 Pete Reichert, American bassist with rock band Rocket from the Crypt at various times from 1990 to present
 Peter Reichert (born 1961), German former footballer
 Robert Reichert (born 1948), American politician, Mayor of Macon, Georgia
 Stephen Joseph Reichert (born 1943), American Roman Catholic archbishop
 Tanja Reichert (born 1976), Canadian actress
 Tim Reichert (born 1979), German professional footballer and co-founder of the SK Gaming e-sports clan

See also
 Reichert, Oklahoma, an unincorporated community in Le Flore County, Oklahoma
 Reichert value, an indicator of how much volatile fatty acid can be extracted from fat through saponification
Reicherts, similar name

Surnames from given names
German-language surnames